Corserine is a hill in the Rhinns of Kells, a sub-range of the Galloway Hills range, part of the Southern Uplands of Scotland. The highest point of the range and the second highest point in Galloway, the usual route of ascent is from the car park at Forrest Lodge to the east of the hill via Loch Harrow and North Gairy Top. Forest Lodge is a short drive from the village of St. John's Town of Dalry.

Climbing
Because of the nature of the rock no good rock climbing has been recorded on Corserine or elsewhere on the Rhinns. However, in winter after a good freeze there are a number of good ice climbs of up to 150 m on the slopes of Milldown just south of Corserine.

External links
 Corserine tourist trail, map and large images
 Corserine to Meikle Millyea trail, map and large images
 Rhinns of Kells north hills from the Old Lead Mines at Casphairn, route, map and large images

References

Marilyns of Scotland
Donald mountains
Corbetts
Mountains and hills of the Southern Uplands
Mountains and hills of Dumfries and Galloway
Climbing areas of Scotland